Shane Kavanagh (born 1983 in Kinvara, County Galway) is an Irish sportsperson.  He plays hurling with his local club Kinvara and was a member of the Galway senior inter-county team. He was captain of the Galway team that won the 2010 National Hurling League title.

References

 

1983 births
Living people
Kinvara hurlers
Galway inter-county hurlers
Connacht inter-provincial hurlers
People from Kinvara